Papilliconus is an extinct genus of sea snails, marine gastropod mollusks in the family Conidae.

Species
Species within the genus Papilliconus include:
 † Papilliconus papillatus Tracey & Craig, 2017
 † Papilliconus radulfivillensis Tracey & Craig, 2017

References

 Tracey S., Craig B., Belliard L. & Gain O. (2017). One, four or forty species? - early Conidae (Mollusca, Gastropoda) that led to a radiation and biodiversity peak in the late Lutetian Eocene of the Cotentin, NW France. Carnets de Voyages Paléontologiques dans le Bassin Anglo-Parisien. 3: 1-38.

 
Conidae